Peter Norman Broughton (born 22 October 1935, Castleford, Yorkshire, England) is a former English first-class cricketer, who played six matches for Yorkshire in 1956 and 24 for Leicestershire from 1960 to 1962.

Broughton was a right-arm fast-medium bowler, who took 85 wickets at 28.58 with a best of 6 for 38 in his third match for Yorkshire, against Somerset in 1956. He scored 162 runs at 10.12 with a best of 17 not out.

He played his early cricket with Castleford C.C. and represented Yorkshire 2nd XI from 1954 to 1957. He went on to be a professional at Idle C.C. in 1957 and 1958, taking 56 wickets at 11.87 in the latter year, and was with Leeds C.C. in 1959. He represented Cumberland in Minor Counties cricket from 1963 to 1969.

In 1980 he was the landlord of a public house in Newmillerdam, Wakefield.

References

External links
Cricinfo Profile

Leicestershire cricketers
Yorkshire cricketers
Cricketers from Castleford
1935 births
Living people
English cricketers
Cumberland cricketers
English cricketers of 1946 to 1968